The Pa'O (or ; ; Eastern Poe Karen: တံင်သူ; ; also spelt Pa-O or Paoh) are the seventh largest ethnic nationality in Burma, with a population of approximately 1,800,000 to 2,000,000.

Other names of the Pa-O include PaU, PhyaU, Piao, Taungthu, Taungsu, Tongsu and Kula.

History
The Pa'O settled in the Thaton region of present-day Myanmar around 1700 AD.  Historically, the Pa'O wore colourful clothing until King Anawratha defeated the Mon King, Makuta of Thaton. The Pa'O were enslaved and forced to wear indigo-dyed clothing to signify their status.

People
The Pa'O people are the second largest ethnic group in Shan State. They also reside in Kayin State, Kayah State, Mon State, and Bago Division. Many of the modern day Pa'O have fled to Mae Hong Son Province, in northern Thailand, due to ongoing military conflicts in Myanmar. They are believed to be of Tibeto-Burman lineage, and share the language and culture of the Karen people.

Subgroups 
They consist of two distinct groups: the Lowland Pa'O, based in Thaton, and the Highland Pa'O, based in Taunggyi. It is believed that there are as many as twenty-four Pa'O subgroups.

The Pa'O subgroups are Htee Ree, Jamzam, Jauk Pa'O,  Khrai,  Khunlon, Khonlontanyar, Kon jam, Loi Ai, Padaung, Pahtom, Pa nae, Pan Nanm, Nan kay, Mickon, Miclan, Ta Kyor, Taret, Tahtwe, Tatauk, Taungthar, Tayam, Ta Noe, Warphrarei and Yin Tai .

Agriculture
The Pa'O predominantly cultivate the leaves of the thanapet tree, onions, garlic, chili, potatoes, rice, peanuts, beans, sesame seeds, mustard leaves, and green tea.

Culture

Fire Rocket Festival
The pwe lu-phaing (Fire Rocket Festival), is celebrated from April to July. The purpose of the festival is to bring ample rain to the villages during the planting season. According to Pa'O tradition, rockets are fired to help the clouds make rain. The village headman determines the size of the rockets. The largest rockets can contain up to 20 kilograms of gunpowder and have a range of 5–6 miles. The rockets, originally made from bamboo, are currently made from iron. Prior to firing, the rocket is carried once around the local temple on someone's shoulder. The festival also demonstrates the unity and friendship among different villages as they gather together for one week. "Pwe" means festival, "Lue" means donation and "Phaing" means to remove sins.

National Day
Pa'O National Day, or Den See Lar Bway, is celebrated on the full moon day of Tabaung, which falls in March. The National Day is a day to remember ancestors and past leaders, such as King Suriya Janthar, whose birthday is also celebrated on National Day. There is a grand parade through Taunggyi followed by a festival.

Religious beliefs
The majority of Pa'O people follow Buddhism, which means that most of their festivals are based on Buddhist festival days. Some Pa'O are Christian, and some maintain Animist beliefs. Poy Sang Long (Pa'O: ပွယ်ꩻသျင်ႏလောင်ꩻ) celebrates the initiation of young boys as novice monks. On reaching adulthood, being ordained a monk is considered a family celebration. During Buddhist Lent, from August to October, Pa'O youth participate in the Pwe Lip May Bo (Pa'O: ပွယ်ꩻလေပ်လူႏမေႏဗို) ceremony. On the monthly full-moon nights, new-moon nights, and both half-moon nights, they surround their local temple with lanterns suspended on strings raised by supporting bamboo stands. The bamboo stands are used to carry the lanterns around the temple three times, the candles being lit as they are carried, as a show of respect to Buddha.

Origin Myth
The Pa'O origin myth states that they are descended from a shaman (weizza), and a female dragon.

Dress

The Pa'O people of upper Myanmar commonly wear black or navy blue. The traditional outfit of the Pa'O consists of a turban, a white shirt, black or navy jacket and long black trousers for men. The women's traditional Pa'O outfit consists of five pieces: a blouse, a jacket, a longyi that covers the knees, a turban, and two large, conical shaped hair pins. Both men and women pin a Pa'O flag badge on to their jacket. It represents the Zawgyi and dragon from their origin story. Men use a large red sling bag to carry knives, hoes or long choppers. Women use a cane or bamboo sling basket. Those from lower Myanmar wear Burmese style clothing.

Marriages
To initiate a marriage, first the young man's parents ask the young woman's parents for the hand of their daughter in marriage on behalf or their son. Her parents can take four or five days to discuss their daughter's wishes. According to custom, guests at the marriage ceremony tie cotton threads around the wrists of both the bridegroom and bride, joining them together while blessing the couple with their best wishes. Common presents include money, farmland, houses, buffaloes, male cows and household items.

Funerals
Villagers take care of funeral arrangements. The body is kept for a couple of nights at home. Food is cooked to offer to the monks and people play card games as a way of giving constant companionship to the departed. After two or three days, the family give praise to the person who died. Common people are buried, while monks are cremated.

Literature
Khun Sein Win, pen-name Kanbawza Maung Phone Yee, was born on 31 August 1948 in the village of North Inya in the southern Shan State of Myanmar. Since graduating from Mandalay Arts and Science University with a B.A., he has received many awards and prizes for his novels and feature magazine articles.  His most famous book, I Want to Say, about Pa'O history, was published in 1985. He has written articles for the Myawaddy, Shu Ma Wa, Ngwe Tayi, Myat Mingala and Doh Kyaungtha magazines. Since 1993 he has chaired the Literature and Magazine Association in Taunggyi. He has worked as an editor for the Shan State Peaceful and Development Council monthly magazine, Kanbawza New Bulletin, and he has been a member of the Shan State Women Committee. He lives in Taunggyi, where he continues to study and write literature. He is also a renowned speaker.

Music
Khun Thar Doon (1940–1978) was one of the early recording stars of Pa'O music. He set up the first Pa'O modern band in the early 1970s. One of his famous songs is "Tee Ree Ree", a song about Pa'O solidarity. This song is still sung at traditional festivals today. He is on the cover of Guitars of the Golden Triangle: Folk and Pop Music of Myanmar (Burma), Vol. 2. Some of the artists appearing on the compilation cover songs he wrote. Some other artists may include Lashio Thein Aung, Saing Saing Maw, and Khun Paw Yann.

Political institutions
Aung Kham Hti is the leader of the Pa-O National Organization (PNO). The party currently has three representatives in the People's Assembly, one in the National Assembly and six in the Local Assembly. Khun San Lwin, a former member of the PNO, is currently Chairman of the Pa'O Self-Administered Zone.

Notable Pa'O
Thamanya Sayadaw
Aung Kham Hti, leader of the PNO (Pa-O National Organization)
Kyaing Kyaing, wife of Than Shwe
Nang Khin Zay Yar, Miss Myanmar International (2012)
Naw Phaw Eh Htar
Billy La Min Aye
Doe Lone
Khun Thar Doon
Khun Paw Rann
Khun Rai Han
Khun Htetz Naing
Hpra Bwar Hla Phe'

References

Ethnic groups in Myanmar
Buddhist communities of Myanmar